Luca Cigarini (born 20 June 1986) is an Italian professional footballer who plays as a midfielder for  club Reggiana.

Club career

Parma
Cigarini was one of the notable youth products in the 2005 Parma squad, alongside Daniele Dessena.

Atalanta
After Parma was relegated to Serie B in June 2008, Cigarini was sold to Atalanta in join-ownership bid, for €4.5 million on 11 July.

Napoli
On 3 July 2009, Cigarini signed for Napoli from Atalanta on a five-year deal for €10.5 million. Atalanta paid Parma €3.5 million plus half the registration rights of Alessio Manzoni to sign Cigarini outright.

On 2 August 2010, Cigarini joined Sevilla FC on a loan deal for the 2010–11 season who paid €292,500 for the loan and, upon conclusion of the season, had the option to purchase the midfielder for €7 million.

Return to Atalanta
Cigarini returned to Atalanta on loan in summer 2011 for free. On 4 July 2012, the loan was renewed for €1.25 million loan fee.

On 5 July 2013, after spending two seasons on loan with Atalanta, a co-ownership deal was agreed to with Napoli for €2.75 million. Cigarini continued to play for Atalanta for the upcoming 2013–14 Serie A season. Cigarini scored his first goal of the season against Lazio on 20 October. In June 2014 Atalanta acquired Cigarini outright for €2.35 million. Atalanta paid €5.75 million transfer fee in total to re-acquire Cigarini.

Sampdoria
After spending five years with Atalanta, Cigarini made the switch from Bergamo to Genoa, signing a permanent deal with Sampdoria.

Cagliari
In 2017, Cigarini moved to Serie A rivals Cagliari in an exchange deal with Nicola Murru.

Crotone
On 8 September 2020, Cigarini signed with Crotone a 2-years contract.

Reggiana
On 23 August 2021, he signed a two-year contract with Reggiana in Serie C, returning to the third tier for the first time since his professional debut season with Sambenedettese.

International career
On 7 September 2007, Cigarini scored his first ever goal (which was also the winning goal) with the Italy U-21 squad in a 2–1 victory over the Faroe Islands in a UEFA U-21 Qualifying match. He was also part of Pierluigi Casiraghi's Olympic team that won the 2008 Toulon Tournament. He also played for Italy in the 2009 UEFA European Under-21 Football Championship.

Cigarini received his first call-up to the senior team on 30 August 2010. New coach Cesare Prandelli named him in the squad for the upcoming Euro 2012 qualifiers as an injury replacement for Claudio Marchisio.

Style of play
Luca Cigarini usually plays as a deep-lying playmaker in midfield, although he is also capable of playing as a central midfielder. He is mostly known for his ability to orchestrate his team's attacking moves, courtesy of his technical qualities and precise long passing. As a youngster, he was nicknamed il Professore (The Professor) by Cesare Prandelli, his Parma youth manager at the time, due to his playmaking abilities and intelligent reading of the game. The Italian sports newspaper La Gazzetta dello Sport has also stated that Cigarini has a similar vision of the game to that of fellow Italian midfielder Andrea Pirlo.

Career statistics

Club

Honours
Italy U21
UEFA European Under-21 Championship bronze:2009

References

External links
Player profile on Napoli's official website
Luca Cigarini National Team Stats at FIGC.it 

Living people
1986 births
Sportspeople from the Province of Reggio Emilia
Association football midfielders
Italian footballers
Italy youth international footballers
Italy under-21 international footballers
Italian expatriate footballers
Expatriate footballers in Spain
Italian expatriate sportspeople in Spain
Olympic footballers of Italy
Footballers at the 2008 Summer Olympics
Parma Calcio 1913 players
A.S. Sambenedettese players
Atalanta B.C. players
U.C. Sampdoria players
S.S.C. Napoli players
Sevilla FC players
Cagliari Calcio players
F.C. Crotone players
A.C. Reggiana 1919 players
Serie A players
Serie C players
La Liga players
Footballers from Emilia-Romagna